Mr. Albertus van Naamen van Eemnes (Zwolle, 27 February 1828 – The Hague, 7 March 1902) was a Dutch politician and lawyer.

He was a moderate liberal politician. He was first a lawyer in the city of Zwolle. In 1866, he was elected as a member of the House of Representatives. In 1879 he lost his seat, but a year later he became first a member of the Senate. In 1889 he succeeded W.A.A.J. baron Schimmelpenninck van der Oye as President of the senate. After his death, another member of the Schimmelpenninck-family (Jan Elias Nicolaas Schimmelpenninck van der Oye) moved to this post..

References

1828 births
1902 deaths
Presidents of the Senate (Netherlands)
Members of the Senate (Netherlands)
Members of the Provincial-Executive of Overijssel
People from Zwolle